Donald Sewell Lopez Jr. (born 1952) is the Arthur E. Link Distinguished university professor of Buddhist and Tibetan Studies at the University of Michigan, in the Department of Asian Languages and Cultures.

Life
Lopez was born in Washington, D.C. and is the son of U.S. Air Force pilot and Smithsonian Institution official Donald Lopez. He was educated at the University of Virginia, receiving a B.A. (Hons) in Religious Studies in 1974, an M.A. in Buddhist Studies in 1977, and his doctorate in Buddhist Studies in 1982. He is married to another prominent Religious Studies scholar, Tomoko Masuzawa.

Lopez is a Fellow of the American Academy of Arts and Sciences and has written and edited many books on various aspects of the religions of Asia. He specializes in late Indian Mahayana Buddhism and in Tibetan Buddhism and commands classical and colloquial Tibetan. In 2008, he gave four talks on The Scientific Buddha: Past, Present, Future as part of a Dwight H. Terry Lectureship at Yale University. In 2012, he delivered the Edwin O. Reischauer Lectures at Harvard, "The White Lama Ippolito".

He is a long-term associate of Yale professor of New Testament studies Dale Martin.

Works

As author
 Buddha Takes the Mound: Enlightenment in 9 Innings. St. Martin's Essentials. May 5, 2020. .
 Hyecho's Journey: The World of Buddhism. University of Chicago Press. 2017. 
 In Search of the Christian Buddha: How an Asian Sage Became a Medieval Saint. With Peggy McCracken. W. W. Norton, April 7, 2014. .
 From Stone to Flesh: A Short History of the Buddha. The University of Chicago Press. April 11, 2013. .
 Gendun Chopel: Tibet's Modern Visionary (Lives of the Masters). Serindia Publications. 2013.
 
 
 
 The Madman’s Middle Way: Reflections on Reality of the Tibetan Monk Gendun Chopel, The University of Chicago Press, 2005.
 Buddhism: An Introduction and Guide, Penguin UK, 2001; published in US as The Story of Buddhism, Harper: San Francisco, 2001
 Italian translation, Che cos'è il Buddhismo, Rome, Ubaldini Editore, 2002.
 Czech edition, 2003.
 Spanish edition, 2009.
 
 Italian translation, Prigionieri di Shangri-La, Rome, Ubaldini Editore, 1999.
 French translation, Fascination tibétaine : du bouddhisme, de l'Occident et de quelques mythes, Paris, Éditions Autrement, 2003.
 Elaborations on Emptiness: Uses of the Heart Sutra, Princeton University Press, 1996; reprint edition, Munshiram Manoharlal, 1998.
 
 A Study of Svatantrika, Snow Lion Press, an imprint of Shambhala Publications, 1987.
 Co-authored and co-edited the award-winning The Princeton Dictionary of Buddhism. See § As editor for details.

As editor
 Donald S. Lopez Jr., ed. Strange Tales of an Oriental Idol: An Anthology of Early European Portrayals of the Buddha, University of Chicago Press, 2016. 
 Robert E. Buswell Jr. & Donald S. Lopez Jr., authors and editors. The Princeton Dictionary of Buddhism, Princeton University Press, 2013, .
 Donald S. Lopez Jr., ed. Critical Terms for the Study of Buddhism. University of Chicago Press, 2005, 
 Donald S. Lopez Jr., ed. Religions of Asia in Practice, Princeton University Press, 2002, .
 Donald S. Lopez Jr., ed. A Modern Buddhist Bible: Essential Readings from East and West. Beacon Press, 2002, 
 Donald S. Lopez Jr., ed. Religions of Tibet in Practice, Princeton University Press, 1997, .
 Donald S. Lopez Jr., ed. Religions of China in Practice, Princeton University Press, 1996. 
 Donald S. Lopez Jr., ed. Religions of India in Practice. Princeton University Press, 1995, 
 Donald S. Lopez Jr., ed. Buddhism in Practice, Princeton University Press, 1995, . Abridged edition, 2007, .
 Donald S. Lopez Jr., ed. Curators of the Buddha: The Study of Buddhism Under Colonialism. University of Chicago Press, 1995, 
 Donald S. Lopez Jr., ed. Buddhist Hermeneutics. University of Hawai'i Press, 1992.

See also
 Buddhism and science
 Shangri-la
 New Age Orientalism

References

External links

 
 
 "The Life, Death and Rebirth of The Tibetan Book of the Dead", Donald S. Lopez Jr., Berfrois, April 13, 2011
 "The Scientific Buddha", Donald S. Lopez Jr., May 8, 2016



1952 births
Living people
Tibetan Buddhism writers
American Buddhist studies scholars
Tibetan Buddhist spiritual teachers
Tibetan Buddhists from the United States
Tibetologists
University of Michigan faculty